Nystalea indiana, or Grote's tropical prominent moth, is a species of prominent moth in the family Notodontidae. It was described by Augustus Radcliffe Grote in 1884 and is found in North America.

The MONA or Hodges number for Nystalea indiana is 7945.

References

 Lafontaine, J. Donald & Schmidt, B. Christian (2010). "Annotated check list of the Noctuoidea (Insecta, Lepidoptera) of North America north of Mexico". ZooKeys. vol. 40, 1-239.
 Metzler, E. & Knudson, E. (2011). "A new species of Elasmia Möschler from New Mexico and Texas, and a new subspecies of Elasmia mandela (Druce) from Texas and Oklahoma (Lepidoptera, Notodontidae, Nystaleinae)". ZooKeys. 149: 51-67.

Further reading

 Arnett, Ross H. (2000). American Insects: A Handbook of the Insects of America North of Mexico. CRC Press.

External links

 Butterflies and Moths of North America

Notodontidae